Vera Romanić (13 April 1911 – 21 August 1993) was a Yugoslav sprinter. She competed in the women's 100 metres at the 1936 Summer Olympics.

References

External links
 

1911 births
1993 deaths
Athletes (track and field) at the 1936 Summer Olympics
Yugoslav female sprinters
Olympic athletes of Yugoslavia
Sportspeople from Graz
Olympic female sprinters